Atlantic. is a 2014 Dutch film directed by Jan-Willem van Ewijk.

Premise 
A man starts to travel 600 kilometers to Europe on a wind surfboard along the Moroccan Atlantic coast.

Cast 
Jan-Willem van Ewijk
Thekla Reuten
Fettah Lamara
Mohamed Majd
Aron Michael Thompson
Boujmaa Guilloul
Hassna Souidi
Steven Novick
Wisal Hatimi
Soufyan Sahli
Mourad Zaoui

Reception
The film has been reviewed by Screen Daily and The Hollywood Reporter.

References

External links

2014 films
Dutch drama films
English-language Dutch films
Films set in Morocco
2010s English-language films